Who Has Your Heart is the second full-length studio album released by Amanda Richards.  It was recorded at Digital MX Studios in Portland, OR and released in February 2009.

Track listing

All songs written, performed and produced by Amanda Richards.

 "Who Has Your Heart"
 "What You See is What You Get"
 "All I Want"
 "Better Than It Ever Was"
 "As Long As I Never See You Again"
 "All But My Heart"
 "Ballbuster"
 "You're Finished Here, Cowboy"
 "Hard to Get"
 "Victim of Circumstance"
 "You Don't Know Me"
 "Perfect Cup of Coffee"
 "Don't Change a Thing"
 "Love Me"
 "Cookies & Whiskey"

Personnel

 Amanda Richards - guitar, lead vocals
 Chris Viola  –  electric guitar
 Casey McBride – drums
 Josh Feinberg – upright bass
 Owen Hoffman Smith – cello, upright bass
 Doug Jones – pedal steel guitar

Production

 Amanda Richards – Producer
 Duane Miller – Engineer and Co-Producer
 James Holk – photography
 Communications Factory Inc. – album cover design

2009 albums